Ek Tera Saath is a 2016 Indian horror film. The film is directed by Arshad Siddiqui starring Sharad Malhotra, Hritu Dudani and Melanie Nazareth in lead roles and was released on 21 October 2016. Ek Tera Saath is a romantic film with a bit of supernatural element. It has been shot in Ghanerao, Jaisalmer, Jodhpur, Delhi, Chandigarh, Shimla and Mumbai. The trailer and its songs were released on 16 September 2016.

Cast 

 Sharad Malhotra as Kuwar Aditya Pratap Singh
 Hritu Dudani as Kusturi/ Nikita
 Melanie Nazareth as Sonali
 Vishwajeet Pradhan
 Deepraj Rana
 Gargi Patel
 Aprajita Mahajan
 Anubhav Dhir

Music 

The music is composed by Sunil Singh, Liyakat Ajmeri & Ali -Anirudh. The soundtrack of Ek Tera Saath was released on 16 September 2016 by Zee Music on YouTube. The songs are sung by Rahat Fateh Ali Khan & K.K.

Crew 
 Director – Arshad Siddiqui
 Cinematographer – Ravi Bhatt
 Associated Director – Tanveer Alam

References

2010s Hindi-language films
Indian horror films
2016 horror films
Hindi-language horror films